BattleMechs (often abbreviated 'Mechs) are large walking war machines that feature prominently in the fictional universe of BattleTech.  'Mechs, which are generally either bipedal or quadrupedal in configuration, are controlled by human pilots and can thus be classified as mecha.

Origins
BattleMechs debuted in FASA Corporation's BattleTech, a board game of futuristic armored combat played with dice, counters and paper record sheets on a map of hexagonal territories. The game's first edition in 1984 was titled BattleDroids and featured mecha based directly on those in the Japanese animated television series Macross and other Japanese animation from the late '70s and early '80s. Legal impediments with George Lucas over the use of the term "droid" forced the name of the game to change in the second edition to BattleTech. This, combined with legal troubles with Playmates Toys, led FASA in the 1990s to remove all images of these early designs from subsequent published material. Since FASA retained the rights to all aspects of the 'Mechs except for their visual depictions, they continued to use the 'Mechs and their stats, but did not print images of them until Technical Readout: Project Phoenix canonized new artwork for the designs. This fact led fans to dub these early 'Mechs the "Unseen," while their new look is colloquially referred to as the "Reseen."

'Mechs in BattleTech vary from one another in many ways, including mass, speed, chassis configuration, armor and armament, resulting in a practically limitless array of legal 'Mech designs. FASA and its successors WizKids, FanPro, and Catalyst Game Labs created hundreds of official BattleMechs to complement the game, the majority published in a long-running series of "technical readouts". The game's detailed construction rules, which allow players to create legal custom units of their own, has also resulted in untold thousands of additional designs, some published in magazines, on websites, and in various other fan media.

As the BattleTech franchise has grown, BattleMechs have increasingly appeared beyond the confines of the board game. A line of figurines, a collectible card game, and numerous computer simulation titles feature the machines; 'Mechs also feature centrally in a prolific series of novels set in the fictional BattleTech universe, as well as an animated spin-off television series.

Backstory
In the BattleTech universe, the first BattleMech ever developed was the Mackie MSK-6S, described as a 100-ton box with legs. It was developed in 2439 by the Terran Hegemony, first deployed in 2443, and produced throughout the rest of the Inner Sphere after its construction plans were stolen in 2455. Significant development and refinement of the technology followed through subsequent centuries.
'Mech advancement in the Inner Sphere crested during the reign of the Star League, but slowly degraded during the protracted conflicts of the Succession Wars. Much of the infrastructure and expertise necessary to produce the most advanced models was lost, with the result that, by the early 31st century, most Great Houses were fielding models that were centuries old.

Star League-era BattleMech technology was preserved during this period of decline by a military faction later known as the Clans. Absent from the Inner Sphere for centuries, they returned in 3049 fielding 'Mechs of considerable sophistication and power. The first confirmed sighting of a Clan 'Mech by an Inner Sphere observer was that of a Timber Wolf (called the Mad Cat by Inner Sphere observers) by the legendary Phelan Kell of the Kell Hounds mercenary unit.

The Clan invasion triggered a resurgence of BattleMech-related research and development, both in the Inner Sphere and among the Clans, leading to many new models being introduced during the 3050s and 3060s.

After the collapse of the 2nd Star League in late 3067, most Battlemech manufactures were damaged or outright destroyed by the Word of Blake Jihad (Holy War). Smaller factories retooled and began manufacturing ancient designs dating back to the Age of War when Mackie was first introduced.
The creation of hybrids from these ancient designs and new technologies again led to a slow progress in 'Mech development, despite the return to all-out war and the use of nuclear weaponry.

However, the collapse of the hyperpulse generator network in the early 32nd century disrupted 'Mech advancement.

Terminology and nomenclature
The term "'Mech" broadly applies to all mecha within the BattleTech universe.  BattleMechs, those that are intended for combat or related operations, are the predominant variety, with the result that the term is frequently applied to all BattleTech mecha. Non-combat models do exist, however, and are generally referred to as WorkMechs or UtilityMechs. These models tend to be specialized to perform a particular task such as harvesting, lumbering, scavenging, repair, etc.

OmniMechs are a sub-class of BattleMech that mount weapons and equipment in modular "pods". The pods are easily swapped or changed, enabling engineers to customize an OmniMech's components for any given mission.

With few exceptions, every major model of BattleMech bears both a name and an identifying code. Codes generally use letters from the 'Mech's name, followed by an alphanumeric reference to the submodel or variant. For example, the base model of the 70-ton Warhammer is WHM-6R, with variants WHM-6X, WHM-7A, etc. A single letter is normally used to indicate common variants of an OmniMech.

Clan 'Mechs are sometimes known by two different names, one assigned by its Clan creators and one by Inner Sphere observers. An example is the 75-ton Clan Timber Wolf, known in the Inner Sphere as the Mad Cat. This practice generally ceased after the mid 3060s.

Configuration
Mechs have a torso that can rotate to either side independently from the legs, but few can do a complete 360 twist. Their power is drawn from fusion reactors and are best suited for ground combat, although they are also capable of limited performance underwater and in outer space.

Bipedal
The majority of BattleMechs are bipedal and can be classed as either humanoid or reverse-joint ("chicken walker"). Humanoid-type BattleMechs are the most common and include the iconic Atlas and Summoner (Thor). Reverse-joint 'Mechs are slightly less common on the field of battle, being quicker but less stable than the humanoid-type, but include such famous models as the Supernova, Marauder, Catapult, Timber Wolf (Mad Cat) and the Dire Wolf (Daishi). There are a few, however, with digitigrade legs that have a raised ankle and stand on their toes, like the legs of a dog, cat, etc. Examples include the Thanatos and Nova Cat.

Quadrupedal
Four-legged "quad" 'Mechs constitute a small segment of official designs, and while they lack the flexibility and speed of bipedal designs, they are considerably more stable and can mount heavier weaponry. Though often maligned, quads experienced a bit of a renaissance in the years after 3060 with several new models released. Notable quad designs include the 25-ton Tarantula, 55-ton Scorpion, and 70-ton Barghest.

Land-Air 'Mech (LAM)
LAMs are an extremely uncommon form of 'Mech capable of transforming between BattleMech and aircraft configurations, an ability that conveys great speed and flexibility at the cost of power and protection. The design of these LAMs, as well as several other 'Mechs, were leased from mecha designs used in The Super Dimension Fortress Macross and other anime series (see variable fighters); resulting real-world legal conflicts ended their official existence within the franchise. The Wasp, Stinger and Phoenix Hawk are the only published LAMs, found in the unrevised edition of Technical Readout: 3025, along with the other "lost" or "unseen" BattleMechs such as the Marauder, Crusader, Warhammer and the non-LAM versions of the Stinger, Wasp, and Phoenix Hawk.

BattleMech construction
BattleMechs are initially made up of a series of internal structure "bones" which are connected together to form the skeleton of the 'Mech. An electroactive polymer called myomer, which contracts in the presence of an electric current, is then wrapped around these bones. This powerful myomer transmission system is what gives BattleMechs their speed and agility in even the roughest terrain.

The necessary electric current for the myomers is provided by a fusion reactor mounted in the torso. This artificial skeleton and musculature combined with a powerful gyroscope provide stability for the BattleMech. The entire system is controlled by a pilot wearing a neurohelmet that effectively links the 'Mech's central computer to the pilot's sense of balance and nervous system. The neurohelmet also gives feedback by providing a kinesthetic sense of the mech's position for better judgement of balance. The movement of a 'Mech is controlled by a combination of throttle, joysticks, and dual pedal system.

All 'Mechs include a cockpit, life support, sensors, engine, gyroscope, and actuator packages. Any space left over after accounting for these components, as well as upgrades to the structure (endo-steel) and armor (ferro-fibrous), may be used for heat sinks, weapon systems, ammunition, or other legal equipment.

'Mechs can carry a variety of weapons, most of which generate heat upon firing. This can become a problem in intense or prolonged fighting, as an overheating 'Mech may shut down or, in extreme cases, explode. To mitigate this, the heat is transferred into massive heat sinks, which help facilitate cooling but do not eliminate the problem entirely. Water is an effective coolant, but impairs movement.

Notes

BattleTech
Fictional mecha